Hybanthus vernonii, the erect violet, is a small plant in the violet family. Found in eastern Australia in eucalyptus woodland, often in sheltered sites on sandstone based soils.

Two subspecies are recognised
 sub-species vernonii
 sub-species scaber

References

vernonii
Flora of New South Wales
Flora of Victoria (Australia)
Taxa named by Ferdinand von Mueller